Shabooh Shoobah is the third studio album by Australian rock band INXS. It was released on 13 October 1982. It peaked at No. 5 on the ARIA Albums Chart and remained on the chart for 94 weeks. It was the band's first album to be released worldwide and appeared on the United States Billboard 200 and on the Hot Pop Albums Chart. The album spawned four singles, "The One Thing", "Don't Change", "To Look at You" and "Black and White". It was produced by Mark Opitz for WEA Australia with most tracks written by band members Andrew Farriss and Michael Hutchence.

Background and production
INXS's third album, Shabooh Shoobah, developed after they decided in early 1982 to record a new song, "The One Thing", at their own expense, with Mark Opitz at Paradise Studios. The song turned out so well that band hired Opitz to produce three more songs. WEA Australia were approached with copies, leading to INXS signing a recording deal in July 1982 with WEA for releases in Australia, South East Asia, Japan and New Zealand; with sister label Atco Records (a subsidiary of Atlantic Records) for North America and with PolyGram for United Kingdom and the rest of Europe.

Initially, INXS were not convinced that Opitz could produce an entire album that would attract international interest. Prior to recording the rest of Shabooh Shoobah, three band members, Kirk Pengilly, Michael Hutchence, and Andrew Farriss, visited the UK and United States, to select another producer. However, they found that no one they wanted was available and that most people advised them that Opitz's work on their single was as good as they could wish for. So in mid-1982, they commenced recording at Rhinoceros Studios, with Opitz. Tim Farriss felt "Mark was the first producer that was able to capture some glimmer of what the band felt it was like live. Prior to us, Mark had done bands like AC/DC, Cold Chisel, The Angels. Big guitar sounds, mighty drum beats".

The name "Shabooh Shoobah" is an onomatopoeia of a rhythm in the song "Spy of Love".

The album spawned four singles, "The One Thing", "Don't Change", "To Look at You" and "Black and White".

Music videos
The music videos for "Don't Change" and "Spy of Love" were directed by South Australian director 
Scott Hicks, later known for his award-winning film Shine. Hicks also directed the video for "To Look at You" in 1983.

Release
In October, Shabooh Shoobah was released internationally on Atlantic/Atco Records and Mercury Records, peaking at No. 52 on the US Billboard 200 and No. 46 on the Hot Pop Albums chart. In Australia it peaked at No. 5 on the ARIA Albums Chart and remained on the chart for 94 weeks. The lead single, "The One Thing", brought their first US Top 30 hit on 28 May 1983, it was a Top 20 hit in Canada, and peaked at No. 14 in Australia on 23 August 1982. "One Thing" was their first video to air on the fledgling MTV and added to the chart success of the single. INXS undertook their first US performance in San Diego in March 1983, to a crowd of 24 patrons. The tour was as support for Adam and the Ants, then support for Stray Cats, The Kinks, Hall & Oates followed by The Go-Go's. INXS played alongside many of their contemporaries on New Wave Day in May 1983, at the US Festival in Devore, California. It was during this time that Gary Grant, their co-manager, relocated permanently to New York to ensure a continual presence in the northern hemisphere. The band remained on the road in the US for most of the year, including support for Men at Work and by mid-1983 were headlining venues such as The Ritz in New York.

Reception
Reviewed at the time of release, Rolling Stone Australia wrote "After the funk and ska of their last two albums, this one is sort of expensive tribal - a touch of the furry animal, a hint of the pagan and some gilt edging. Perhaps it's too glib to dismiss INXS as the next Duran Duran, but undeniably Shabooh Shoobah has all the hallmarks of current British pop."

Rip It Up wrote "From the opening "The One Thing", it sways and swaggers through two sides of sheer musical bliss. Very ably led by vocalist Michael Hutchence, who handles all songs with an almost arrogant ease."

It peaked at No. 5 on the ARIA Albums Chart and remained on the chart for 94 weeks. It was the band's first album to be released worldwide and appeared on the United States Billboard 200 and on the Hot Pop Albums Chart.

At the 1982 Countdown Australian Music Awards, the album was nominated for Best Australian Album.

Of the single "To Look at You," Cash Box said that "Michael Hutchence intones the lyrics upon a 'Shabooh Shoobah' drumbeat" and that "when guitars finally do enter the picture, they seem to slice the melody in half."

Track listing

Personnel 
INXS
 Michael Hutchence – vocals
 Andrew Farriss – keyboards 
 Tim Farriss – guitars
 Kirk Pengilly – guitars, saxophone, vocals
 Garry Gary Beers – bass, vocals
 Jon Farriss – drums, percussion, vocals

Production 
 Mark Opitz – producer, engineer 
 David Walsh – engineer (1)
 David Nicholas – engineer (2-10)
 Andrew Scott – engineer (2-10)
 Bob Ludwig – mastering (USA)
 Paul Ibbotson – mastering (Australia)
 Michael Hutchence – cover art concept
 Grant Matthews – cover art concept, photography 
 Chris Murphy – management 
 Recorded at Paradise Studios (track 1) and Rhinoceros Studios (tracks 2–10) (Sydney, Australia).
 Mastered at Masterdisk (New York City, New York, USA) and Festival Studios (Sydney, Australia).

Charts

Weekly Charts

Year-end charts

Certifications

Notes

INXS albums
1982 albums
Atco Records albums
Mercury Records albums
Warner Music Group albums
Albums produced by Mark Opitz